Nina West is the stage name of Andrew Robert Levitt, an American drag queen, activist, actor, and singer-songwriter based in Columbus, Ohio. She rose to national prominence with her appearance on the eleventh season of RuPaul's Drag Race, where she placed sixth and won Miss Congeniality. She was named the Top Local Artist of 2019 by Columbus Underground. West has also released three EPs—Drag Is Magic, John Goodman, and The West Christmas Ever, all released in 2019.

Education
Levitt was raised in Greentown, Ohio. He graduated from Denison University with a degree in theater. He planned to pursue acting, but decided not to move to New York City, due to the September 11 attacks.

Career

West began dabbling in drag in 2001. Her drag mother is Virginia West. She hosts the annual "Heels of Horror" show at Axis Nightclub, and has also hosted the competition "So You Think You Can Drag?" In 2008, she won the Entertainer of the Year award; her ensemble later inspired the singer Sia's outfit at the 2016 Coachella Valley Music and Arts Festival. West was included in Columbus Business First "40 Under 40" list in 2018. Levitt worked as a social media strategist for Axis Nightclub as of 2018 and has done social media and marketing for Union Cafe since 2013.

West competed in the eleventh season of RuPaul's Drag Race. She had previously auditioned for the show nine times, but failed to make the final cast selection. She won the third episode for her performance in the 'Diva Worship' challenge, and impersonated Sarah Sanders on the fourth episode, "Trump: The Rusical". In the "Snatch Game" challenge, she became the first queen in the show's history to impersonate someone from the actual original Match Game, with her impersonation of Jo Anne Worley. She then won the "Dragracadabra" challenge in episode ten. She was eliminated in the following episode, losing a lip sync to Silky Nutmeg Ganache. She was subsequently crowned Miss Congeniality in the series finale.

After her elimination, a number of celebrities and public figures took to social media to voice their support for Nina West, including Rep. Alexandria Ocasio-Cortez and Scott Hoying. West reported that Rihanna sent her a private message following her elimination.

A street in Columbus was named after Levitt, called "The Nina West Way". She was interviewed with Adore Delano and Monet X Change for an episode of The View in June 2019. She starred in Coaster, an animated short film directed and produced by Amos Sussigan and Dan Lund. She attended the 71st Primetime Emmy Awards, where she became the first person to walk the purple carpet in full drag. West was announced as part of the cast for the first ever season of RuPaul's Secret Celebrity Drag Race, a spin-off where Drag Race alumni transform celebrities into drag queens, premiering in 2020.

Since Drag Race, West has starred in several commercials, with some of the brands including Pantene, Pepsi, and OraQuick, as well as being involved in campaigns for films such as Trolls World Tour and Maleficent: Mistress of Evil. On June 5, 2021, children's television channel Nickelodeon released an advertisement featuring West to explain to children the meaning of Pride as a part of their Pride month celebration.

Nina West plays Edna Turnblad in the musical Hairspray for the 2021-2022 national tour.

Music 

After her elimination, West announced that she would release a children's music album, Drag Is Magic, and a comedy EP, John Goodman, by May 17, 2019. She released a music video for her first single "Hucks" on May 10, 2019.

Personal life and philanthropy
Levitt lives in Columbus, Ohio. He is gay and an advocate and fundraiser for the LGBTQIA community. His focuses have included HIV/AIDS testing and safe sex, marriage equality, and trans rights. The Nina West Fund, established at The Columbus Foundation , is thought to be the only "drag-queen-supported fund of its kind" in the U.S. The fund has raised more than $2 million, supporting charities such as the ACLU of Ohio (fundamental rights), Dress for Success Columbus (career development for women), Equitas Health (focused on HIV/AIDS treatment), and Kaleidoscope Youth Center (the largest LGBTQIA youth center in Ohio).

In 2017, he received the Create Columbus Commission Visionary Award from the Columbus City Council and an equality award from the Human Rights Campaign Columbus chapter.

Discography

Extended plays

Singles

Filmography

Film

Television

Theatre

Music videos

Web series

References

External links

 
 Columbus Makes Art

1977 births
Living people
Activists from Ohio
American drag queens
American LGBT rights activists
Denison University alumni
Gay entertainers
LGBT people from Ohio
People from Columbus, Ohio
Nina West